The Valea Iașului is a left tributary of the river Argeș in Romania. It flows into the Argeș in Curtea de Argeș.

References

Rivers of Romania
Rivers of Argeș County